DXAQ may refer to:

 DXAQ-AM, a defunct AM radio station in Davao City
 DXAQ-FM, an FM radio station broadcasting in Dipolog, branded as Radyo Bisdak